Saheb Biwi Aur Gangster 3 is a 2018 Indian crime thriller film directed by Tigmanshu Dhulia. It is the sequel of 2013's Saheb, Biwi Aur Gangster Returns which was also directed by Tigmanshu Dhulia and the third installment of Saheb, Biwi Aur Gangster film series.

Sanjay Dutt, Jimmy Sheirgill, Mahi Gill, Chitrangada Singh and Soha Ali Khan play the lead roles in the film. Pamela Singh Bhutoria can be seen in an exciting supporting role as well. It released on 27 July 2018 and received poor reviews from critics. This is third edition of the Saheb, Biwi and Gangster series.

Plot

Aditya returns from jail and tries to reclaim his political legacy. On meeting London-based gangster Uday Pratap Singh, the war for the survival of the richest and the shrewdest begins.

Cast
Sanjay Dutt as Uday Pratap Singh 
Jimmy Sheirgill as Aditya Pratap Singh  
Mahi Gill as Madhavi Devi 
Deepak Tijori as Vijay Pratap Singh, Uday Pratap Singh's Brother  
Chitrangada Singh as Suhani
Soha Ali Khan as Ranjana
Kabir Bedi as Maharaja Hari Singh, Uday Pratap Singh's father
Nafisa Ali as Raj Mata Yashodhara, Uday Pratap Singh's mother
Deepraj Rana as Kanhaiya
Pamela Singh Bhutoria as Deepal, Kanhaiya's daughter
Zakir Hussain as Bunny uncle, Ranjana's father
Rishina Kandhari as News Reporter

Production

Development
In May 2017, it was announced that Sanjay Dutt had become a part of the project and would be playing the role of a gangster in the film. In August 2017, it was reported that Chitrangada Singh had been signed opposite Sanjay Dutt in the film.

Filming
The principal photography of the film commenced in September 2016 in Bikaner, Rajasthan. After completing the first schedule in October 2017, the production unit moved to Jodhpur for the second schedule of the film which continued until November 2017. The final schedule of shooting was completed in January 2018 in Mumbai.

Soundtrack

The soundtrack of the film has been composed by Rana Mazumder, Anjjan Bhattacharya, Siddharth Pandit while the lyrics are written by Sandeep Nath, Revant Shergill, Kausar Munir, Kumaar and Raja Mehdi Ali Khan.

Reception
Ronak Kotecha from The Times of India rated the film at 3.5 out of 5. Udita Jhunjhunwala for Mint wrote "The weakest of the trilogy, this story takes exceedingly long to set up the key players and their motivations. Dhulia does end part three neatly poised for a follow up. That might work too, as long as Gill and Sheirgill are at the epicentre and the gangster is not required to dance and sing romantic songs amidst sand dunes." Saibal Chatterjee for NDTV wrote "It has taken the third Saheb, Biwi Aur Gangster instalment five years to take shape. One had expected time to add value to it. That does not seem to have happened. Devoid of the delirious energy, sly swerves and deeply melancholic core that defined the earlier entries, Saheb, Biwi Aur Gangster 3 struggles for the most part to hit the ground and run."

References

External links

2010s Hindi-language films
Indian thriller films
Indian sequel films
Indian gangster films
Films directed by Tigmanshu Dhulia
2018 thriller films
Hindi-language thriller films
Films scored by Anjjan Bhattacharya